The Heath Is Green may refer to:

 The Heath Is Green (1932 film), a German musical film
 The Heath Is Green (1951 film), a German drama film
 The Heath Is Green (1972 film), a German remake